Zora Petrović (Dobrica, May 17, 1894 – Belgrade, May 25, 1962) was a Serbian painter. Her notable works can be seen in the Museum of Contemporary Art in Belgrade, and in Pavle Beljanski Memorial Collection in Novi Sad.

Biography
She attended a high school in Pančevo from 1907 to 1909. In 1912 she enrolled at the Belgrade Arts and Crafts School, where Milan Milovanović, Đorđe Jovanović and Marko Murat were her teachers. 

She studied painting in Budapest under professor Lajos Deák Ébner, and took part in the courses of professors Pál Szinyei Merse and Istvan Reti of the Barbizon in Nagybanya artists' colony and school, considered very influential in Hungarian and Romanian art. The period from 1915 to 1919 was spent as a student at the Hungarian Royal Drawing School and Art Teachers' College (what became the Hungarian University of Fine Arts) under the guidance of professor Lajos Deák Ébner. She returned to Belgrade in 1919 to attend the Arts and Crafts Painting School with professor Ljubomir Ivanović. After, she worked as a teacher in a Belgrade college, and from 1921 to 1944, she taught at the Second Women's Gymnasium "Queen Natalia". From 1925 to 1926, she lived in Paris where she worked in the studio André Lhote for a year.

She worked as a drawing teacher at the atelier of Mladen Josić School of Painting as a part-time professor of painting from 1942 to 1944. In 1952, she received a job at the Academy of Fine Arts in Belgrade and worked there for the rest of her life. She died in Belgrade on May 25, 1962, and was buried in Pančevo.

Painting was her greatest and only love. Since she was unmarried and did not have her own family, Petrović devoted all of her free time to painting.  Through her works in oil and watercolor, she wanted to express her love toward life as a whole, poor people and particularly toward the peasant woman from various regions of Serbian lands. She was aware that many people could not understand her artistic creations, yet she painted and continued to paint the way her heart told her to.
 
Though she has her own accomplished and individual style in painting -- a robust contemporary poetic realism -- Zora Petrović did not live in a closed circle of her own artistic creations. 

Her life and her growth as an artist are identical. Even as a beginner, she did not follow the tradition of European women artists. She has always maintained an isolated artistic individuality, strong and bold in color and style.
 
She was a painter of broad and heavy strokes and a painter of vivid colors and monumental works.

Zora Petrović has always maintained an isolated artistic individuality.

See also
 List of painters from Serbia

References

1894 births
1962 deaths
20th-century Serbian painters
Serbian women artists
Serbian women painters
20th-century women artists
Serbian schoolteachers